Sands Key is an island north of the upper Florida Keys in Biscayne National Park.  It is in Miami-Dade County, Florida.

It is located in lower Biscayne Bay, between Elliott Key and Boca Chita Key.

History
Earlier names for the island were "Las Tetas", "The Paps", "Pownal Kay", "Pownall Island", "Restinga de Las Tetas" and "Saunder's Key".

"Las Tetas" is Spanish for "breasts".  The island was most likely called this due to two hills, perhaps Indian mounds located there.  Bahamians referred to the island as "Saunder's Key".

References

Islands of the Florida Keys
Uninhabited islands of Miami-Dade County, Florida
Biscayne National Park
Islands of Florida